George Mamalassery (born 22 April 1932 in Kalathoor) is an Indian clergyman and bishop for the Roman Catholic Diocese of Tura. He was ordained in 1960. He was appointed in 1979. He retired in 2007.

References 

Indian Roman Catholic bishops
1932 births
Living people
20th-century Indian Roman Catholic priests